Hyorhinomys stuempkei, the hog-nosed shrew rat or Sulawesi snouter, is a species of rodent in the family Muridae, more specifically in the subfamily Murinae,  endemic to Sulawesi, Indonesia. This species was discovered in 2015 by Jacob A. Esselstyn and his team, Anang S. Achmadi, Heru Handika, and Kevin C. Rowe", Esselstyn proposed "Sulawesi snouter" as a common name for it. The word "snouter" references the fictional text, The Snouters: Form and Life of the Rhinogrades by the German zoologist Gerolf Steiner.  Steiner wrote this text as a fictional naturalist, Harald Stümpke, and the specific epithet of H. stuempkei pays homage to this fictional individual.

It is known only from Mount Dako in Tolitoli Regency, North Sulawesi, Indonesia.

The species has particularly long incisors. Unusually, it lacks the coronoid process jaw muscle attachment point, presumably because its diet of earthworms and beetle larvae does not require forceful chewing.

Its morphological distinctions from other shrew rats, along with phylogenetic analysis, led to it being placed in the new genus Hyorhinomys as the only species.

References

Old World rats and mice
Endemic fauna of Indonesia
Rodents of Sulawesi
Mammals described in 2015